Khalaj-e Malmir (also Romanized as Khalaj-e Mālmīr; also known as Khalach and Khalaj) is a village in Malmir Rural District, Sarband District, Shazand County, Markazi Province, Iran. At the 2006 census, its population was 198, in 57 families.

References 

Populated places in Shazand County